Costin Petrescu may refer to:

Costin Petrescu (musician) (born 1949), Romanian rock musician
Costin Petrescu (painter) (1872–1954), Romanian painter